Cycloheptene is a 7-membered cycloalkene with a flash point of −6.7 °C. It is a raw material in organic chemistry and a monomer in polymer synthesis.  Cycloheptene can exist as either the cis- or the trans-isomer.
{|
| 
| 
|-
| align ="center"|cis-Cycloheptene
| align ="center"|trans-Cycloheptene
|}

trans-Cycloheptene 
With cycloheptene, the cis-isomer is always assumed but the trans-isomer does also exist. One procedure for the organic synthesis of trans-cycloheptene is by singlet photosensitization of cis-cycloheptene with methyl benzoate and ultraviolet light at −35 °C. The double bond in the trans isomer is very strained. The directly attached atoms on a simple alkene are all coplanar. In trans-cycloheptene, however, the size of the ring makes it impossible for the alkene and its two attached carbons to have this geometry because the remaining three carbons could not reach far enough to close the ring (see also Bredt's rule). There would have to be unusually large angles (angle strain), unusually long bond-lengths, or the atoms of the alkane-like loop would collide with the alkene part (steric strain). Part of the strain is relieved by pyramidalization of each alkene carbon and their rotation relative to each other. The pyramidalization angle is estimated at 37° (compared to an angle of 0° for an atom with normal trigonal–planar geometry) and the p-orbital misalignment is 30.1°.  Because the barrier for rotation of the double bond in ethylene is approximately 65 kcal/mol (270 kJ/mol) and can only be lowered by the estimated strain energy of 30 kcal/mol (125 kJ/mol) present in the trans-isomer, trans-cycloheptene should be a stable molecule just as its homologue trans-cyclooctene. In fact, it is not: unless the temperature is kept very low, rapid isomerization to the cis-isomer takes place.  The trans-cycloheptene isomerization mechanism is not simple alkene-bond rotation, but rather an alternative lower energy pathway. Based on the experimentally observed second order reaction kinetics for isomerization, two trans-cycloheptene molecules in the proposed pathway first form a diradical dimer. The two heptane radical rings then untwist to an unstrained conformation, and finally the dimer fragments back into two cis-cycloheptene molecules. Note that the photoisomerization of maleic acid to fumaric acid with bromine is also bimolecular.

References

External links 
 MSDS

Cycloalkenes
Monomers
Seven-membered rings